Johannes Kleingeld (born 10 June 1971) is a South African badminton player. He was the men's doubles champion at the African Championships in 1998 and 2004. Kleingeld competed at the 2003 and 2007 All-Africa Games, and helped the team win the gold medal in 2003. He also represented his country at the 1994 and 1998 Commonwealth Games.

Achievements

All-Africa Games 
Men's doubles

African Championships 
Men's singles

Men's doubles

Mixed doubles

IBF International 
Men's singles

Men's doubles

Mixed doubles

References

External links 
 
 
 

1971 births
Living people
South African male badminton players
Badminton players at the 1994 Commonwealth Games
Badminton players at the 1998 Commonwealth Games
Commonwealth Games competitors for South Africa
Competitors at the 2003 All-Africa Games
Competitors at the 2007 All-Africa Games
African Games gold medalists for South Africa
African Games silver medalists for South Africa
African Games bronze medalists for South Africa
African Games medalists in badminton